is a professional Japanese baseball player. He plays pitcher for the Tochigi Golden Braves.  He previously played for the Chunichi Dragons.

External links

 NPB.com

1995 births
Living people
Baseball people from Fukuoka Prefecture
Japanese baseball players
Nippon Professional Baseball pitchers
Chunichi Dragons players